Tiruchirappalli, often referred to as "Educational Hub", has many centuries-old educational institutions. Among those who graduated from its institutions are Nobel laureate C. V. Raman, Nirmala Sitharaman, Minister of Finance of India, former Presidents of India A. P. J. Abdul Kalam, R. Venkataraman, Sujatha, K. A. P. Viswanatham, and Vanitha Rangaraju.

Universities
 Anna University, Trichy
 Bharathidasan University
 National Institute of Technology, Trichy
 Prist University, Trichy campus
 Tamil Nadu National Law School
 Indian Institute of Information Technology, Trichy
 Indian Institute of Management, Trichy
 Dhanalakshmi Srinivasan University, Samayapuram, Trichy
 SRM University, Trichy

Medical colleges 

 K.A.P. Viswanatham Government Medical College
 Chennai Medical College Hospital and Research Centre (CMCHRC), Tiruchirappalli 
 SRM Medical College and Hospital, Trichy
 Dhanalakshmi Srinivasan Medical College, Samayapuram, Trichy 
 Krishna Medical College, Irungalur

Agricultural colleges 

 Agricultural Engineering College & Research Institute, Kumulur, Trichy
 Anbil Dharmalingam Agricultural College & Research Institute, Trichy
 Horticultural College & Research Institute for Women, Trichy

Law colleges 

 Tamil Nadu National Law School
 Government Law College, Trichy

Business schools 
 CARE BUSINESS SCHOOL
 HALLMARK BUSINESS SCHOOL (HBS), Trichy
 Indian Institute of Management (IIM), Trichy
 Bharathidasan Institute of Management (BIM-Trichy)
 St. Joseph's Institute of Management (JIM)

Engineering colleges

 Jayaram College of Engineering and Technology-JCET
 CARE College of Engineering
Designed Environment Academy & Research Institute
 Dhanalakshmi Srinivasan Institute Of Technology
 Anna University of Technology, Trichy campus
 Mahalakshmi Engineering College
 M.A.M College of Engineering
 M.I.E.T Engineering College
 MAM College of Engineering and Technology
 Saranathan college of Engineering
 Shivani Institute of Technology
 Shri Angalamman College of Engineering and Technology
 Trichy Engineering College
 K. Ramakrishnan college of Engineering
 Government College of Engineering, Srirangam
 Indra Ganesan College of Engineering
 Pavendar Bharathidasan College of Engineering & Technology
 Oxford Engineering College
 Saranathan College of engineering
 Mookambigai College of Engineering

Arts and science colleges
 Bishop Heber College
 Nehru Memorial College,Puthanampatti
 Jamal Mohamed College
 National College, Trichy
 Periyar E.V.R. College
 St. Joseph's College
 CARE College of Arts and Science
 Srimad Andavan Arts and Science College
 Holy Cross College
 Aiman College of Arts & Science For Women
  Cauvery College for Women
 Urumu Dhanalakshmi College
 Government Arts College, Tiruchirappalli
 Seethalakshmi Ramaswami College
 Shrimati Indira Gandhi College
 M.I.E.T Arts & Science College
 Christhu Raj College

Polytechnic colleges
Seshasayee Institute of Technology, Trichy
Government Polytechnic College, Thuvakudi
Government Polytechnic College, Srirangam
MIET Polytechnic College, Trichy
 JJ polytechnic college, Ammapettai, Trichy

Schools and institutions
Kamakoti vidyalaya ICSE school
Santhanam Vidyalaya senior secondary school
Bishop Heber Higher Secondary School, Teppakulam
Bishop Heber Higher Secondary School, Puthur
CSI Methodist Girls Higher Secondary School, Woraiyur
All Saints Elementary School
Sri Vageesha Vidhyashram
Boiler Plant Boys Higher Secondary School 
SBIOA Matriculation and Higher Secondary School, K.K.Nagar
SBIOA CBSE School, K.K.Nagar
 Arockiamatha Matriculation Higher Secondary School, Karumandapam
 ADAMS MATRICULATION AND HIGHER SECONDARY SCHOOL, AIRPORT, TRICHY
 Aldams School k k Nagar
 Alpha Cambridge International School (IGCSE)
 Alpha Wisdom Vidyashram Senior Secondary School (CBSE)
 Alpha Plus Matriculation Higher Secondary School School (Matric)
Montfort School, Kattur, Tiruchirappalli (CBSE)
 RSK Higher Secondary School
 Campion Anglo-Indian Higher Secondary School
 Sri Akilandeswari Vidhyalaya, T.V.Kovil, Trichy
 E R Higher secondary school, Trichy
 Higher Secondary School for Boys, Srirangam
 Kamala Niketan Montessori School (CBSE)
 Kendriya Vidyalaya No.1, Ordnance Estate
Kendriya Vidyalaya No.2, HAPP
Kendriya Vidyalaya GOLDEN ROCK 

Mount Litera Zee School Trichy
 National School, Trichy
Rajaji Vidyalaya
Periyar Centenary Memorial Matriculation Higher Secondary School, KK nagar, Trichy
Railway Mixed Higher Secondary School, Golden Rock, Tiruchirappalli
R.C Hr.Sec.School
 St. James Matriculation Higher Secondary School
 St Johns Vestry Anglo Indian Higher Secondary School
 St. Joseph's Anglo Indian Girls Higher Secondary School
 Amirta Vidyalayam school, Erratai Vaikkal, vayalur Road.[CBSE] 
 SRV Matriculation Higher Secondary School, Samayapuram
Akara world school, KK Nagar
Government ADW Boys Higher Secondary School, KATTUR.

References 

Education in Tiruchirappalli
Tiruchirappalli-related lists
Lists of universities and colleges in India by city
Lists of universities and colleges in Tamil Nadu
Tamil Nadu education-related lists